Robert E. Cooper Sr. (October 14, 1920  July 10, 2016) was an American judge. He was a justice of the Tennessee Supreme Court from 1974 until his retirement in 1990. Cooper was born in Chattanooga, Tennessee and attended the University of North Carolina (1946) and Vanderbilt University (1949). He was the chairman of the Tennessee Judicial Council and served on the Sixth Judicial Circuit (1953–1960) and Tennessee Court of Appeals (1960–1974).

Robert E. Cooper Sr. died on July 10, 2016, at his home on Signal Mountain, Tennessee, following a brief illness.

His son, Robert E. Cooper Jr., is the former Attorney General of Tennessee, serving from 2006 until 2014.

References

1920 births
2016 deaths
People from Chattanooga, Tennessee
University of North Carolina alumni
Vanderbilt University alumni
Justices of the Tennessee Supreme Court
People from Signal Mountain, Tennessee
20th-century American judges